C.W. Kim (born Chon Won on August 3, 1938, in Namwon, South Korea) is an American architect based in San Diego. He is responsible for multiple buildings in San Diego, such as the Spinnaker (completed in 2007) and the hexagon-shaped Emerald-Shapery Center. He also serves as assistant professor at the New School of Architecture in San Diego and on the boards of directors for United Way and the La Jolla Museum of Contemporary Art. In addition, he speaks at seminars and attends charity events.

References

American people of Korean descent
Architects from California
People from Namwon
1938 births
Living people